Meatballs & Spaghetti is an American animated television series that aired on CBS on Saturday morning from September 18, 1982 to September 10, 1983. The show was produced by Intermedia Entertainment Company and Marvel Productions and aired on Starcade, CBS's Saturday morning cartoon programming block. It was one of the last Saturday morning cartoon series to be fitted with a laugh track.

The show was not well received, with a Variety review saying, "No try at music here, or even much comedy either. It's without any socially redeeming value."

Summary 
The series centered on Meatballs & Spaghetti, a husband-and-wife singing duo who roamed the country in a mobile home with their friend Clyde (who was their bassist), and their dog Woofer (who was their drummer). The main characters — fat Meatballs and skinny Spaghetti — were intended to be a mix of popular musicians Meat Loaf and Sonny & Cher. There was at least one original song in each episode.

Voice cast 
 Ron Masak as Meatballs
 Sally Julian as Spaghetti
 Frank Welker as Woofer
 Barry Gordon as Clyde

Additional voices 
 Jack Angel
 Wally Burr
 Phillip Clarke
 Regis Cordic (credited as Rege Cordic)
 Peter Cullen
 Ronald Gans
 David Hall
 Morgan Lofting (credited as Margan Lofting)
 Bill Ratner
 Ronnie Schell
 Marilyn Schreffler
 Hal Smith
 Paul Winchell

Episodes

References

External links 
 
 Episode index at the Big Cartoon DataBase

CBS original programming
English-language television shows
1980s American animated television series
1982 American television series debuts
1983 American television series endings
American children's animated comedy television series
Fictional singers
Television series by Marvel Productions
Television series by MGM Television